Charles Bartlett may refer to:

Charles W. Bartlett (1860–1940), English painter and printmaker
Charles W. Bartlett (lawyer) (1845–1916), American lawyer and politician
Charles Lafayette Bartlett (1853–1938), U.S. Representative from Georgia, 1895–1915
Charles L. Bartlett (journalist) (1921–2017), winner of the 1956 Pulitzer Prize for National Reporting
Charles Henry Bartlett (1885–1968), British track cyclist
Charles Bartlett (film director) (1888–?), American silent film director
Charles Bartlett (artist) (1921–2014), British artist
Charles Alfred Bartlett (Iceberg Charlie, 1868–1945), captain of the HMHS Britannic
Charles Bartlett (RAF officer) (1889–1986), English World War I flying ace
Charles L. Bartlett (mayor) (1851–1898), U.S. baker and mayor of Marlborough, Massachusetts
Charles H. Bartlett (1833–1900), American lawyer and politician in New Hampshire
Charles Bartlett (American football) (1899–1965), college football player
Charles Bartlett (rower), Australian lightweight rower

See also
Charles Bartlett Johnson (born 1933), American businessman and billionaire
Charlie Bartlett, a 2007 film comedy